Monsters of Rock: Platinum Edition is a compilation album featuring many hard rock and heavy metal hits. It was released as a 2 disc set exclusively through telephone orders and its website and a single disc version sold in stores.

Track listing

Disc One
"Nothin' but a Good Time" - Poison
"Cherry Pie" - Warrant
"Kiss Me Deadly" - Lita Ford
"Nobody's Fool" - Cinderella
"Once Bitten, Twice Shy" - Great White
"Rock You Like a Hurricane" - Scorpions
"Poison" - Alice Cooper
"I Hate Myself for Loving You" - Joan Jett & The Blackhearts
"Don't Treat Me Bad" - FireHouse
"Edge of a Broken Heart" - Vixen
"Cum On Feel the Noize" - Quiet Riot
"The Final Countdown" - Europe
"Bang Bang" - Danger Danger
"After the Rain" - Nelson
"Turn Up the Radio" - Autograph

Disc Two
"18 and Life" - Skid Row
"Up All Night" - Slaughter
"Round and Round" - Ratt
"Wait" - White Lion
"Seventeen" - Winger
"We're Not Gonna Take It" - Twisted Sister
"Wait for You" - Bonham
"In My Dreams" - Dokken
"Just Like Paradise" - David Lee Roth
"Give It to Me Good" - Trixter
"Epic" - Faith No More
"Smooth Up in Ya" - Bulletboys
"Just Take My Heart" - Mr. Big
"Easy Come Easy Go" - Winger
"Empire" - Queensrÿche

Retail version
"18 and Life" - Skid Row - 3:50
"Nothin' But a Good Time" - Poison - 3:44
"Cherry Pie" - Warrant - 3:20
"Nobody's Fool" - Cinderella - 4:47
"Kiss Me Deadly" - Lita Ford - 3:58
"Round and Round" - Ratt - 4:23
"Up All Night" - Slaughter - 3:44
"Rock You Like a Hurricane" - Scorpions - 4:12
"Seventeen" - Winger - 4:04
"We're Not Gonna Take It" - Twisted Sister - 3:38
"Once Bitten, Twice Shy" - Great White - 3:59
"Wait" - White Lion - 4:01
"Cum on Feel the Noize" - Quiet Riot - 4:49
"Poison" - Alice Cooper - 4:28
"Don't Treat Me Bad" - FireHouse - 3:56
"Just Like Paradise" - David Lee Roth - 4:04
"I Hate Myself for Loving You" - Joan Jett & The Blackhearts - 4:07
"The Final Countdown" - Europe - 4:00

References

External links
Monsters of Rock Platinum Edition

2006 compilation albums